Međimurska gibanica(Medjimurian layer cake) is a type of gibanica or layer cake originating from Međimurje County, Croatia. It is made of puff pastry and four fillings: nuts, fresh cheese, poppy seeds and apples, as well as of many additional ingredients. It is a traditional dish especially popular in Northern Croatia, rich in flavour and full of calories, a delicacy which is an integral component of Croatian cuisine.

This recipe is one of the large number of regional varieties of gibanica which have been developed throughout the Balkans.

Preparation and serving

A base layer of prepared dough is stretched in a suitable casserole previously greased with fat. It is then covered with the first of four layers of filling consisting of milk sodden chopped or ground walnuts, fresh quark cheese, milk sodden ground poppy seed and grated apples. The layer of filling is spread over the entire surface, followed by the second layer of dough, the second layer of filling and so on, until all four layers of filling are put on. The final layer of dough is topped with poured sour cream previously mixed with melted butter and/or egg. 

The casserole is put into oven and baked for approximately one hour at 200°C. The cake can be served either still warm directly from the casserole or left to cool to room temperature. It can be cut into quarters or rectangles and finally sprinkled with powdered sugar.

Specifics

Međimurska gibanica is a specific type of gibanica, which differs from other varieties in several details concerning the dough, the fillings, the look and the composition of some secondary or additional ingredients (sugar, sour cream, milk, butter, eggs, raisins, cinnamon etc.). Compared, for instance, with prekmurska gibanica, it contains puff pastry instead of shortcrust pastry, as well as fresh quark cheese instead of ricotta or cottage (curd) cheese. At first sight it can be seen that međimurska gibanica has simpler and thicker four-layer fillings instead of doubled and thinner eight-layer fillings of prekmurska gibanica. Generally, it is juicier and softer than most other types of gibanica.

See also

Prekmurska gibanica – a similar, but more elaborate and "formal" gibanica, from the neighbouring Slovenian region of Prekmurje
Börek
Pogača

References

External links
Međimurska gibanica on the official website of the Tourist Board of Međimurje County
Recipe from a bakery company
Recipe from a restaurant offering old regional dishes
Detailed preparation procedure with photos
Međimurska gibanica among large number of types of gibanica
A međimurska gibanica baking competition show on television
Some good quality close-up photos

Cheese dishes
Gibanica
Croatian pastries
Pastries with poppy seeds
Apple dishes
Layer cakes

de:Gibanica#Međimurska gibanica